The Higher Institute of National Defence was an organ of the Coalition Government of Democratic Kampuchea, then of the Khmer Rouge remnants in 1990s, with an advisory role on military issues. It was established in 1985.

When Pol Pot left the leadership of the Party of Democratic Kampuchea and of the National Army of Democratic Kampuchea in 1985 for age limits, he was appointed Director of the newly established Higher Institute of National Defence, apparently a facade position, but actually a very powerful one, since the institute's role was to sum up the experiences of the guerrilla resistance and to advise the Government and the Army on the new course of actions. Moreover, since Pol Pot was the recognised communist leader of Cambodia his influence did not vanish, and for instance, he was able to order the arrest and execution of former NADK Supreme Commander Son Sen in 1997.

The Higher Institute ceased to exist with the dissolution of the Provisional Government of National Union and National Salvation of Cambodia in 1998, but probably its functions were over since Pol Pot's arrest and show trial in 1997.

Khmer Rouge
Military wings of political parties
Military history of Cambodia